Strawberry latent ringspot virus (SLRSV)  is a plant pathogenic virus in an Unassigned family. Its entry in the ICTV database indicates this virus is a Sadwavirus but current literature indicates that it may be a Cheravirus.

Hosts 
Primary hosts:
 Strawberry plants
 Mint plants
Other hosts: (see)
 List of viruses
 List of apricot diseases
 List of caneberries diseases
 List of strawberry diseases
 List of rose diseases
 List of peach and nectarine diseases
 List of grape diseases

Symptoms 
Leaves become patchy and reddish in color. There are decreased yields.

References
1. Bertolini, Edson; Antonio Olmos, Maria M. Lopez and Mariano Cambro.(2003) Multiplex nested Reverse transcription-Polymerase chain reaction in a single tube for sensitive and simultaneous detection of Four RNA viruses and Pseudomonas savastanoi pv. savastanoi in Olive trees. Phytopathology 2003, vol. 93, no3, pp. 286-292

2. Edson Bertolini, Antonio Olmos, M. Carmen Martinez, Maria Teresa Gorris, Mariano Cambra.(2001) Single-step multiplex RT-PCR for simultaneous and colourimetric detection of six RNA viruses in olive trees. Journal of Virological Methods 96 (2001) 33–41

3. Ioannis E. Tzanetakis a,∗, Joseph D. Postman b, Rose C. Gergerich c, Robert R. Martin A virus between families: nucleotide sequence and evolution of Strawberry latent ringspot virus Virus Research 121 (2006) 199–204

4. TingWei, Guangjin Lu, Gerard Clover (2008) Novel approaches to mitigate primer interaction and eliminate inhibitors in multiplex PCR, demonstrated using an assay for detection of three strawberry viruses. J Virol Methods. 2008 Jul;151(1):132-9

External links
 ICTVdB - The Universal Virus Database: Strawberry latent ringspot virus
 Family Groups - The Baltimore Method
 ICTV Virus Taxonomy 2009 
 UniProt Taxonomy 

Secoviridae
Viral strawberry diseases
Viral grape diseases